Marshall Cirque is an ice-filled cirque,  wide, located 1 nautical mile southwest of Kienle Cirque on the west side of White Island, in the Ross Archipelago, Antarctica. It was named by the Advisory Committee on Antarctic Names (1999) after Dianne L. Marshall of the Geophysical Institute at the University of Alaska, Fairbanks, who investigated the volcanic activity and seismicity of nearby Mount Erebus in 1981–82 and 1982–83.

References

Cirques of Antarctica
Landforms of the Ross Dependency
White Island (Ross Archipelago)